Crepuscular rays are sunbeams that originate when the Sun is just below the horizon, during the twilight period. Crepuscular rays are noticeable when the contrast between light and dark is most obvious. Crepuscular comes from the Latin word , meaning "twilight". Crepuscular rays usually appear orange because the path through the atmosphere at sunrise and sunset passes through up to 40 times as much air as rays from a high Sun at midday. Particles in the air scatter short-wavelength light (blue and green) through Rayleigh scattering much more strongly than longer-wavelength yellow and red light.

Loosely, the term crepuscular rays is sometimes extended to the general phenomenon of rays of sunlight that appear to converge at a point in the sky, irrespective of time of day.

A rare related phenomena are anticrepuscular rays which can appear at the same time (and coloration) as crepuscular rays but in the opposite direction of the setting sun (east rather than west).

Gallery

See also

References

External links

Atmospheric optical phenomena
Sun